Amy Atkinson (born August 5, 1989) is a sprinter and middle-distance runner and former association football player from Guam.  She competed in the 2010 Guam Athletics Championships where she won three gold medals. Atkinson took part in the 2011 Pacific Games, where she broke the national record for the Women's 3000m steeplechase event, which she still holds. Atkinson represented Guam in Istanbul at the Women's 400m event at the 2012 IAAF World Indoor Championships. Atkinson also competed in the Women's 800m event at the 2012 Summer Olympics in London, but did not advance to the semifinals.  She broke the national 800m record with a time of 2:18.53.

Early life and education 
Amy Atkinson graduated with an elementary education degree from Biola University. She played on Biola's soccer team, as well as Guam women's national football team.

Olympic career 
Atkinson qualified for the 2012 Summer Olympics in the 800 m middle-distance race with a universality placement. Atkinson broke a record that stood for 22 years, with a time of 2:18.53. Her personal best prior to this was 2:21.30. There were five runners in her heat, and she was as high as second place at the end of the first lap. Her competitors pulled ahead, and she finished last in her heat, failing to advance to the semifinals.

Pacific Games
During the 2011 Pacific Games, Atkinson broke 5 minutes in the 1,500 m for the first time.

Achievements

References

External links
 
 

1989 births
Living people
Guamanian female middle-distance runners
Guamanian steeplechase runners
Guamanian women
Female steeplechase runners
Olympic track and field athletes of Guam
Athletes (track and field) at the 2012 Summer Olympics
Guamanian women's footballers
Guam women's international footballers
Women's association football defenders
Footballers from Baden-Württemberg
People from Ostfildern
Sportspeople from Stuttgart (region)
Guamanian Christians
Biola Eagles women's soccer players
Biola University alumni